The Master of Peterhouse, Cambridge (formerly the Master of Peterhouse College) is the head of the oldest Cambridge University college, Peterhouse.  As of 2014 there have been 52 masters (counting John Cosin twice), the incumbent being Bridget Kendall.

List of masters

See also
 List of members of Peterhouse, Cambridge
 List of Vice-Chancellors of the University of Cambridge

Notes

References
 Victoria County Histories, A History of the County of Cambridge and the Isle of Ely: Volume 3, The City and University of Cambridge, The colleges and halls: Peterhouse, (pp. 334-340) London, 1959.

 
Peterhouse